Treutler's gecko (Hemidactylus treutleri) is a species of lizard in the family Gekkonidae. The species is endemic to India.

Etymology
The specific name, treutleri, is in honor of German-born Irish herpetoculturist Uli Treutler (1951–2006).

Geographic range
H. treutleri is found in the southern Indian states of Andhra Pradesh and Telangana.

Habitat

References

Further reading
Mahony S (2009). "A New Species of Gecko of the Genus Hemidactylus (Reptilia: Gekkonidae) from Andhra Pradesh, India". Russian Journal of Herpetology 16 (1): 27–34. (Hemidactylus treutleri, new species).
Narayana BL, Baburao G, Rao VV (2016). "Distribution of Treutler's Gecko (Hemidactylus treutleri Mahony, 2009) in Telangana and Andhra Pradesh, southern India – a general information". Reptile Rap, Newsletter of the South Asian Reptile Network (SARN) (18): 25–28.
Narayana BL, Surender G, Rao VV (2014). "Hemidactylus treutleri from Eastern Ghats, Andhra Pradesh, India". Taprobanica 6 (1): 55.
Sreekar R, Deodhar S, Kulkarni Y (2010). "Predation on Hemidactylus treutleri (Squamata: Gekkonidae) by the peninsular rock agama Psammophilus dorsalis (Squamata: Agamidae) in Rishi Valley, Andhra Pradesh, India". Herpetology Notes, Publication of the Societas Europaea Herpetologica 3: 33–35.

Hemidactylus
Reptiles described in 2009
Endemic fauna of India
Reptiles of India